Rhondda Bosworth (born 1944) is a New Zealand photographer.

Life
Bosworth was born in Takapuna, Auckland in 1944. She studied painting and photography at the University of Canterbury and the University of Auckland.

In 1975 she was part of the exhibition Six Women Artists, organised by Allie Eagle at the Robert McDougall Art Gallery in Christchurch, exhibiting with Stephanie Sheehan, Joanna Harris, Helen Rockel, Joanne Hardy, and Jane Arbuckle.

In 1989–1990, Bosworth's work was included in Imposing Narratives, a photographic exhibition which toured New Zealand.

In 2015, Bosworth's work was included in an exhibition on New Zealand women artists at the Adam Art Gallery in Wellington, Interior Histories: Fragments Of A World At 40.

References

1944 births
Living people
New Zealand women artists
New Zealand photographers
Artists from Auckland
University of Canterbury alumni
University of Auckland alumni
Date of birth missing (living people)
New Zealand women photographers
People from Takapuna
Photographers from Auckland